Kata Kálmán (1909 – 1978) was a Hungarian photographer. 

In 2012 her book A Csibe-ügy. Egy fotográfus naplója Móricz Zsigmond utolsó éveiről (English: The Csibe Case. A Photographer's Diary on the Last Years of Zsigmond Móricz) was published posthumously. 

Her work is included in the Museum of Fine Arts Houston, the Art Institute of Chicago, the Hungarian Museum of Photography, Kecskemét, and the Hungarian National Museum.

References

1909 births
1978 deaths
20th-century Hungarian women artists